Marc Giacone is a composer, organist and improviser from Monaco.

Born in 1954 at Monaco, he studied pipe organ with the masters Émile Bourdon, Canon Henri Carol, and Jean Wallet, musical improvisation with Pierre Cochereau and musical composition (harmony, counterpoint, orchestration).

Composer, electroacoustic researcher, virtuoso improviser, he belongs to the new generation of contemporary musicians for which all the forms of musical expression can find their place in masterpiece and even combine (jazz, fusion, folklore, atonality, dodecaphony, sound effects, etc.).

He composes many pieces for organ, harp, piano, flute, trombone, vibraphone, orchestra, synthesizer, cinema, television, radio, etc. He currently teaches articulation, traditional organ, improvisation and musical theory.

On 2 July 2005, Giacone was named titular of the Cavaillé-Coll organ of the Carmes' Chapel of Monaco. He got a trial, because he had made a satire about Prince Albert.

Giacone, the owner of a new satirical website, featuring cartoons allegedly defaming and ridiculing the Prince Albert II and other local politicians risks a 6-month prison sentence and a fine of €1500. The website, Monaco Politic Circus, which was meant to imitate the famous French satirical political weekly newspaper Charlie Hebdo, has been suspended.

Discography - Organ works
Symphonie Cosmique (Vol.1 - KRM0001)
Ombres & Lumières
Tsunami
Prospective 2005
Music of Today (Calcante - CAL CD045)

References 

20th-century classical composers
21st-century classical composers
Monegasque classical organists
Organ improvisers
Monegasque electronic musicians
1954 births
Living people
Monegasque composers
Male composers
Male classical composers
Male classical organists
20th-century organists
21st-century organists
20th-century male musicians
21st-century male musicians